Marie Toussaint (born 27 May 1987 in Lille) is a French jurist and politician who was elected as a Member of the European Parliament in 2019.

Early life and education
Born in Lille in 1987, Toussaint is the daughter of a sailor and a professor of economics in technical high school, both involved in the International Movement ATD Fourth World. She grew up in Bordeaux. After graduating, she joined Sciences Po through priority education agreements. She also holds a master's degree in international environmental law.

Political career
At the age of 18, Tousaint entered politics at Europe Ecology – The Greens and became co-secretary of the Young Ecologists in 2011. At the same time, she volunteered for the Yasuní-ITT Initiative, launched by Ecuadorian President Rafael Correa for the preservation of Yasuni National Park.

In 2015, Toussaint founded Notre affaire à tous, an NGO defending a right to climate justice. Together with Oxfam France, Greenpeace France and the Foundation for Nature and Man, their national climate justice campaign "Affaire du siècle" was launched on December 17, 2018 to sue the state for its inaction in the fight against global warming. The associated petition became the most signed in France in less than a week, collecting 2 million signatories in a month.

Member of the European Parliament, 2019–present

During the 2019 European Parliament election, Toussaint was in fourth place on the EELV's list of candidates. She has since been serving on the Committee on Industry, Research and Energy.

In addition to her committee assignments, Toussaint is part of the Parliament's delegations for relations with the United States and to the Euro-Latin American Parliamentary Assembly (EuroLat). She is also a member of the European Parliament Intergroup on Anti-Corruption, the European Parliament Intergroup on Anti-Racism and Diversity, the European Parliament Intergroup on Climate Change, Biodiversity and Sustainable Development, the European Parliament Intergroup on Fighting against Poverty, the European Parliament Intergroup on LGBT Rights, the European Parliament Intergroup on the Welfare and Conservation of Animals and the Responsible Business Conduct Working Group.

Political positions
In May 2021, Toussaint joined a group of 39 mostly Green Party lawmakers from the European Parliament who in a letter urged the leaders of Germany, France and Italy not to support Arctic LNG 2, a $21 billion Russian Arctic liquefied natural gas (LNG) project, due to climate change concerns.

References

1987 births
Living people
MEPs for France 2019–2024
Europe Ecology – The Greens MEPs
Europe Ecology – The Greens politicians
21st-century French women politicians
Sciences Po alumni
Politicians from Lille
Politicians from Hauts-de-France